Alessandro Fei (1543–1592) was an Italian painter active in Florence, working in a Mannerist style. He was also called il Barbiere (the Barber). He participated in the Vasari-directed decoration of the Studiolo of Francesco I with an oval canvas relating a Goldsmith Shop story. He also painted an altarpiece on the Flagellation of Christ for the Basilica church of Santa Croce in Florence.
Trained under Ridolfo del Ghirlandaio. Piero Francia, and under Tommaso Manzuoli, better known as Maso da San Friano, Fei became a member of the Accademia dell’Arte e del Disegno in Florence in 1563 and was a trusted assistant of Giorgio Vasari up until 1574. The artist spent most of his career in Florence, except for a trip to Rome at the side of the Aretine painter to decorate the Vatican chapels of Pope Pius VI.

Works 
His most famous works included The Goldsmith's Workshop, an oil-based painting, The Virgin and Saints and his five stone tiles The Life of the Virgin.

References

1543 births
1592 deaths
Painters from Florence
16th-century Italian painters
Italian male painters